"La Ballade des gens heureux" (translation: The Ballad of the Happy People) is a song by Gérard Lenorman, released in 1975. English singer and songwriter Jonathan King wrote the British lyrics and had a hit with it as The Happy People Song.

Charts

References 

French pop songs
Pop ballads
1970s ballads
1975 songs
1975 singles
Gérard Lenorman songs
CBS Disques singles

Songs written by Pierre Delanoë